John George Eugène Jolas (October 26, 1894 – May 26, 1952) was a writer, translator and literary critic.

Early life
John George Eugène Jolas was born October 26, 1894, in Union Hill, New Jersey (what is today Union City, New Jersey). His parents, Eugène Pierre and Christine (née Ambach) had immigrated to the United States from the Rhine borderland area between France and Germany several years earlier. In 1897 the family later returned to Forbach in Elsass-Lothringen (today in French Lorraine), where Jolas grew up, and which had become part of Germany in 1871 following the Franco-Prussian War.

In 1909, he moved on his own to New York City, where he learned English while attending DeWitt Clinton Evening High School and earning a modest living as a deliverer.

Career
After schooling, Jolas worked in Pittsburgh as a newspaper journalist for the German-language Volksblatt und Freiheits-Freund and the English-language Pittsburgh Sun.

During 1925 and 1925, Jolas worked for the European edition of the Chicago Tribune in Paris, first on the night desk, then as a reporter. Eventually, David Darrah prompted Jolas to take over the Tribune's literary page from Ford Madox Ford. He did so, and he authored the weekly column, "Rambles through Literary Paris." His work in that capacity allowed him to meet many of the famous and emerging writers of Paris, both French and expatriates alike. These connections would serve him well in his subsequent editorial work.

Along with his wife Maria McDonald and Elliot Paul, in 1927 he founded the influential Parisian literary magazine, transition.

In Paris, Eugene Jolas met James Joyce and played a major part in encouraging and defending Joyce's 'Work in Progress' (which would later become Finnegans Wake), a work which Jolas viewed as the perfect illustration to his manifesto, published in 1929 in transition.

The manifesto, sometimes referred to as the Revolution of the Word Manifesto, states, in particular, that 'the revolution in the English language is an accomplished fact', 'time is a tyranny to be abolished', 'the writer expresses, he does not communicate', and 'the plain reader be damned'.

On many occasion, he used to write under the pseudonym 'Theo Rutra'.

As a translator, he is perhaps best known for rendering Alfred Doblin's novel Berlin Alexanderplatz into English in 1931.

In 1941, Jolas published something of a successor to transition in a volume entitled Vertical: A Yearbook for Romantic-Mystic Ascencions.

Jolas subsequently suspended his editing work to join the United States Office of War Information in 1942; he translated war news into French for Allied troops in North Africa as well as the French resistance. In 1945, Jolas went to Germany to help launch denazified newspapers in towns controlled by the allied forces. He was later named editor in chief of the Deutsche Allgemeine Nachrichten-Agentur (DANA, later renamed DENA), an organization established to teach American-style journalism as a means for replacing the Nazis' propaganda apparatus.

Published works
Secession in Astropolis (1929) Black Sun Press
The Language of Night (1932), Servire Press
I Have Seen Monsters and Angels
Man from Babel (Yale University Press, 1998)
Eugene Jolas: critical writings, 1924–1951 (Northwestern University Press, 2009)
An essay on James Joyce in Our Exagmination Round His Factification for Incamination of Work in Progress (1929), a collection on Joyce that also included contributions from Samuel Beckett, Stuart Gilbert, Robert McAlmon, William Carlos Williams.

References

External links
"Author Information: Eugene Jolas". Internet Book List.
Perloff, Marjorie. "Eugene Jolas's Multilingual Poetics and Its Legacies". University at Buffalo.
Rosenberg, Karen. "Celebrating the Spirit of the Avant-garde". The Yale Herald.
Kelly, Robert (January 3, 1999). "Lost Man of the Lost Generation". The New York Times.
Eugène and Maria Jolas Papers. General Collection, Beinecke Rare Book and Manuscript Library.
Eugène and Maria Jolas Papers: Addition. General Collection, Beinecke Rare Book and Manuscript Library, Yale University.

1894 births
1952 deaths
People from Union City, New Jersey
American literary critics
American magazine publishers (people)
20th-century American translators